|-
| Fakići
| Donji Vakuf
| 
|-
| Fakovići
| Fakovići
| 
|-
| Falanovo Brdo
| Konjic
| 
|-
| Faletići
| Stari Grad, Sarajevo
| 
|-
| Falešići
| Srebrenik
| 
|-
| Fališi
| Višegrad
| 
|-
| Faljenovići
| Goražde
| 
|-
| Faočići
| Goražde
| 
|-
| Fatnica
| Bileća
| 
|-
| Ferhatlije
| Hadžići
| 
|-
| Ferizovići
| Rogatica
| Republika Srpska
|-
| Filipovići
| Loznica
| 
|-
| Fojhar
| Srebrenica
| 
|-
| Fojnica
| Fojnica
| 
|-
| Fojnica, Fojnica
| Fojnica
| 
|-
| Fojnica
| Gacko
| 
|-
| Fonjge
| Donji Vakuf
| 
|-
| Foča
| Foča
| 
|-
| Foča
| Doboj
| 
|-
| Furde
| Kozarska Dubica
| Republika Srpska
|}

Lists of settlements in the Federation of Bosnia and Herzegovina (A-Ž)